Common Struggles is the debut and only album released by the Denver, Colorado-based rock band Single File. It was released on April 7, 2009 through Reprise Records. The first radio single from the album is "Girlfriends" released in March 2009.

Track listing 
 "Mannequin Loveseat" – 3:17
 "Don't Hate" – 3:13
 "Girlfriends" – 3:02
 "Airports" – 3:33
 "Pizzagirl" – 2:56
 "Miss Cherry Lipgloss" – 3:05
 "Melody Of You" – 2:43
 "Blue Sky Happiness" – 3:23
 "Zombies Ate My Neighbors" – 3:01
 "Dear Meghan" – 3:13
 "Benson Shady Grove (Save Yourself)" – 3:04

Personnel 
 Sloan Anderson – lead vocals, guitar, bass
 Chris Depew – drums, backing vocals
 Joe Ginsberg – bass, guitar, keyboards
 Produced by Howard Benson
 Mixed by Tom Lord-Alge

References 

2009 albums
Albums produced by Howard Benson
Reprise Records albums